Longxing Temple (隆興寺) is an ancient Buddhist monastery in Zhengding, Hebei, China.

Longxing Temple may also refer to:
Qingzhou Longxing Temple (龍興寺), Shandong; site of one of China's 100 major archaeological discoveries in the 20th century
Longxing Temple (Xinjiang) (龍興寺), a Shanxi cultural site
Longxing Temple (Yanling), a Hunan cultural site

Buddhist temple disambiguation pages